Léonin (also Leoninus, Leonius, Leo) was the first known significant composer of polyphonic organum. He was probably French, probably lived and worked in Paris at the Notre Dame Cathedral and was the earliest member of the Notre Dame school of polyphony and the ars antiqua style who is known by name.  The name Léonin is derived from "Leoninus," which is the Latin diminutive of the name Leo; therefore it is likely that Léonin's given French name was Léo.

Overview
All that is known about him comes from the writings of a later student at the cathedral known as Anonymous IV, an Englishman who left a treatise on theory and who mentions Léonin as the composer of the Magnus Liber, the "great book" of organum.  Much of the Magnus Liber is devoted to clausulae—melismatic portions of Gregorian chant which were extracted into separate pieces where the original note values of the chant were greatly slowed down and  a fast-moving upper part is superimposed.  Léonin might have been the first composer to use the rhythmic modes, and may have invented a notation for them. According to W.G. Waite, writing in 1954:  "It was Léonin's incomparable achievement to introduce a rational system of rhythm into polyphonic music for the first time, and, equally important, to create a method of notation expressive of this rhythm."

The Magnus Liber was intended for liturgical use.  According to Anonymous IV, "Magister Leoninus (Léonin) was the finest composer of organum; he wrote the great book (Magnus Liber) for the gradual and antiphoner for the sacred service."  All of the Magnus Liber is for two voices, although little is known about actual performance practice: the two voices were not necessarily soloists.

According to Anonymous IV, Léonin's work was improved and expanded by the later composer Pérotin.  See also Medieval music.

The musicologist Craig M. Wright believes that Léonin may have been the same person as a contemporaneous Parisian poet, Leonius, after whom Leonine verse may have been named. This could make Léonin's use of meter even more significant.

References

Further reading
 
 
 Articles Anonymous theoretical writings, Organum, Leonin, Perotin, The New Grove Dictionary of Music and Musicians, ed. Stanley Sadie.  20 vol.  London, Macmillan Publishers Ltd., 1980. 

External links
 
 

Ars antiqua composers
12th-century French composers
French classical composers
French male classical composers
Medieval male composers